The AS ONE Black Eagles are an American football team located in Osaka, Osaka, Japan.  They are a member of the X-League.

Team history
1970 Team Founded.
1971 Team named the Black Eagles
1989 New sponsorship agreement signed with Java apparel group. Team renamed the Java Black Eagles.
1993 Lost to Sanwa Bank in the Green Bowl Final 12-21. At the end of the Fall season, Java ends sponsorship with the team.
1994 Team name changed to the Osaka Black Eagles.
1997 New sponsorship agreement signed with (Ltd.) Iuchi 
2001 Iuchi Ltd. changes company name to As One Co., Ltd. Team name changed to As One Black Eagles.

Seasons

References

External links
  (Japanese)

American football in Japan
1970 establishments in Japan
American football teams established in 1970
X-League teams